Kaiafas lake is a lake in Elis in southwestern Greece, extending north of the town of Zacharo. It lies between the Lapithas Mountains and the Ionian Sea.

External links

Lakes of Greece
Landforms of Elis
Landforms of Western Greece